The Love & War MasterPeace is the third studio album by American recording artist Raheem DeVaughn, released on March 2, 2010, through Jive Records. It was also released as a deluxe edition with an additional disc of bonus material. Recording sessions for the album took place during 2008 to 2009 and production was handled primarily by Kenny "Dope" Gonzalez.

The album debuted at number nine on the U.S. Billboard 200 chart, selling 45,000 copies in its first week. Upon its release, The Love & War MasterPeace was well received by music critics.

Background 
Production for the album was handled primarily by Kenny "Dope" Gonzalez, with contributions from Ne-Yo, Stereotypes, and Lil' Ronnie, among others. In a press release for the album, DeVaughn explained its title, stating "I named the album The Love & War MasterPeace because I feel that where I am as a person and where we are as a people, we are all trying to master that internal peace and happiness in a very strange time." In an interview for Vibe, he described the album as "half socially conscious, half love". In an interview with Pete Lewis of Blues & Soul, DeVaughn discussed his intentions for the album, stating "The plan from the gate was to have the two vibes - social conscience and love/romance. And, with that being definitely something that Marvin Gaye was known for I think that's why I get those comparisons with him."

Singles 
The album's lead single, "Bulletproof", was released on September 22, 2009, and features rapper Ludacris. The single charted at number 46 on the U.S. Hot R&B/Hip-Hop Songs, number 64 on the European Hot 100 Singles, and number 48 on the Canadian Hot 100. "Lyin to Myself" was released promotionally on December 1, 2009. Prefixmag reviewed the song praising Raheem for his "lyrics, voice and style." "I Don't Care" was released as the album's second single on January 25, 2010. It spent 20 weeks and peaked at number 36 on the US Hot R&B/Hip-Hop Songs. The album's third single "B.O.B." was released June 20, 2010. The single peaked at number 79 and spent five weeks on the Hot R&B/Hip-Hop Songs chart.

Reception

Commercial performance 
The album debuted at number nine on the U.S. Billboard 200 chart, with first-week sales of 45,000 copies in the United States. It also entered at number three on Billboards R&B/Hip-Hop Albums, and it reached number 11 on Billboards Digital Albums chart. It ultimately spent 10 weeks on the Billboard 200 and 36 weeks on the R&B/Hip-Hop Albums. As of August 2013, the album has sold 179,000 copies in the United States.

Critical response 

The Love & War MasterPeace was well received by music critics. Billboard writer Gail Mitchell praised the album's themes and music, writing "Drawing from a palette rich in R&B, hip-hop and jazz, DeVaughn has crafted a powerful, thought-provoking album". Giving it 4½ out of 5 stars, Allmusic writer Andy Kellman cited The Love & War MasterPeace as "one of the most grippingly conscious major-label R&B albums of the last 30 years", viewing its love-themed songs as "imaginative and excellent" and praising its socially conscious material. The Washington Posts Sarah Godfrey called it "a masterpiece" and compared DeVaughn to soul musician Marvin Gaye, writing "like Gaye, he can deliver songs for both babymaking and movement-building". Ken Capobianco of The Boston Globe praised DeVaughn's vocals and called the album a "smartly executed set". Toronto Star writer Ashante Infantry gave it 3½ out of 4 stars and called it "a grooving, unconventional and utterly compelling album".

Despite viewing its thematic concept as flawed, Washington City Paper writer Ben Westhoff praised its "wild ambition" and musical quality, stating "it instead works in the realm of the lush, the dark, and the dramatic, striving for a chiseled-in-granite sound. There’s not a note out of place here; the music is at times sweeping and blustery, at other times cautious and foreboding". Detroit Free Press writer Brian McCollum gave the album 3 out of 4 stars and wrote that it "dances a careful line between oldfangled soul and commercial R&B". Jon Pareles of The New York Times wrote that The Love & War Masterpeace is "destined to be split into separate love and war playlists", but ultimately praised DeVaughn's themes of "social consciousness and seduction", writing "at least Mr. DeVaughn has more than one thing on his mind". The Philadelphia Inquirers A.D. Amorosi viewed its skits by Dr. Cornel West as "confident and paternal", and wrote that the album "finds DeVaughn embracing his political side with a sociocultural vision that's subtle, sharp, and never loses track of its contagious songcraft".

The album was nominated for a Grammy Award for Best R&B Album, presented at the 53rd Grammy Awards in 2011.

Track listing

Personnel 
Credits for The Love & War MasterPeace adapted from Allmusic.

Musicians 

 Algebra – vocals
 Eugenia "Chinablac" Bess – background vocals
 Bilal – vocals
 Mike Ciro – bass, guitar, sitar
 Citizen Cope – vocals
 Phil Cornish – keyboards
 Rudy Currence – vocals
 Dave Darlington – keyboards
 Alfredo de la Fé – strings
 Chico DeBarge – vocals
 Raheem DeVaughn – executive producer, vocal arrangement, vocals
 Dwele – vocal arrangement, vocals
 Anthony Hamilton – vocals
 Patrick Hayes – guitar

 Shelby Johnson – vocals
 Debbie Knapper – guitar
 Ledisi – vocals
 Ludacris – vocals
 Damian Marley – vocals
 Chrisette Michele – vocals
 James Preston – keyboards
 Luisito Quintero – percussion
 Jill Scott – vocal arrangement, vocals
 Jerard Snell – drums
 Leonard "E-Flat" Stephens – keyboards
 Wale – vocals
 Shawn Whitley – bass, keyboards
 Malik Yusef – vocals

Production 

 Ivan "Orthodox" Barias – engineer, keyboards, producer, programming
 Leslie Brathwaite – mixing
 DJ Wayne Williams – A&R
 Kenny Dope – producer
 John Drye – mixing
 Jeff Fenster – A&R
 John Frye – mixing
 Carvin "Ransum" Haggins – engineer, producer
 Yas Inoue – engineer
 Ronnie "Lil Ronnie" Jackson – producer
 Jaycen Joshua – mixing
 Jamil "Face" Johnson – engineer
 Larry "Rock" Campbell – A&R
 Chris "Symfonikz" Lewis – programming
 Giancarlo Lino – assistant

 Joyal McNeil – make-up
 Jackie Murphy – art direction
 Ne-Yo – producer
 Richie Owings – prop stylist
 Herb Powers – mastering
 Mike Pratt – assistant
 Tennyson Richards – groomer
 Nick Roache – engineer
 Brea Stinson – stylist
 Randee St. Nicholas – photography
 Stereotypes – producer
 Symfonikz – producer
 Big Bob Terry – producer, programming
 Denise Trotman – art direction, design
 Jerry Vines – executive producer, management, producer

Charts

References

External links 
 
 Raheem DeVaughn: Class Act at Blues & Soul
 R&B's Raheem DeVaughn... 'Masterpeace' at The Washington Post

2010 albums
Raheem DeVaughn albums
Jive Records albums